Frank Jones (born 3 October 1960) is a Welsh former footballer, who played as a defender. Mostly playing in the Welsh football league, he made appearances in the English football league with Wrexham.

Career
A product of Wrexham's youth system, Jones turned professional in 1978, making 8 appearances in his first spell at the club.

Jones would leave in 1981, having spells at Oswestry Town, Bangor City and Conwy United before returning to Wrexham in 1985.

He would only stay one season, before he would move back into the Welsh football league with Rhyl, before returning to Conwy United and ending his career at home-town club Llandudno.

During his career, Jones won a cap for the Wales Under-21 team.

References

1960 births
Living people
People from Llandudno
Sportspeople from Conwy County Borough
Welsh footballers
Association football defenders
Wrexham A.F.C. players
Oswestry Town F.C. players
Bangor City F.C. players
Conwy Borough F.C. players
Rhyl F.C. players
Llandudno F.C. players
English Football League players